Charles Lewis Henry (July 1, 1849 – May 2, 1927) was an American lawyer and politician who served two terms as a U.S. Representative from Indiana from 1895 to 1899.

Biography 
Born in Green Township, Hancock County, Indiana, Henry moved with his parents to Pendleton, Indiana. He attended the common schools and Asbury (now DePauw) University and graduated from the law department of Indiana University at Bloomington in 1872. He was admitted to the bar and commenced practice in Pendleton, eventually moving to Anderson, Indiana in 1875. He served as a member of the state senate in 1880, 1881, and 1883.

Congress 
Henry was elected as a Republican to the Fifty-fourth and Fifty-fifth Congresses (March 4, 1895 – March 3, 1899), but declined to be a candidate for renomination in 1898.

Later career and death 
He was interested in the development and operation of electric interurban railways. Henry is credited with coining the phrase "interurban" (of Latin derivation meaning "between cities"). At the time of his death he was president and receiver of the Indianapolis & Cincinnati Traction Co., which he had managed for twenty-three years. He died in Indianapolis, Indiana, May 2, 1927 and was interred in Maplewood Cemetery, Anderson, Indiana.

References

1849 births
1927 deaths
Politicians from Anderson, Indiana
Republican Party Indiana state senators
Indiana University Maurer School of Law alumni
DePauw University alumni
People from Hancock County, Indiana
People from Pendleton, Indiana
Burials in Indiana
Republican Party members of the United States House of Representatives from Indiana